Your Songs is a studio album by American jazz singer Harry Connick Jr. that was released by Columbia. It was released first in the United States on a limited edition double vinyl LP on August 25, 2009, then on CD on September 22.

Background
Most of the songs were chosen by record producer Clive Davis, who aimed towards classic, familiar songs, as contemporary as possible. Davis had expressed an interest in working with Connick. Connick had an idea of bringing in a famous arranger for the album, but Davis suggested Connick do the arrangements himself.

The song "Bésame Mucho" was suggested by Connick's father, Harry Connick Sr., a former district attorney for the Parish of Orleans. They sang a duet on the album New Orleans...My Home Town (1998). Branford and Wynton Marsalis contribute to the album. Both are multiple Grammy winners. Both are childhood friends of Connick. Trumpeter Wayne Bergeron and guitarist Bryan Sutton also play on the album.

Connick said in a radio interview that "Smile" was dedicated to a girl named Nicola. She and her mother attended one of Connick's shows in Paris, France, several years before. Nicola was seven at the time, and Connick took her on a tour of Paris. They stood under the Eiffel Tower. Although she was blind, she knew where she was and had a smile on her face.

Promotion
On August 4, 2009, Connick had an album listening party in New York City, hosted by Sony Music chief creative executive Clive Davis. Amongst those in attendance were Alan Cumming, Bernadette Peters, Brian Williams, Kelli O'Hara, Rachael Ray, Mario Cantone, Rosie Perez, and David Hyde Pierce.

A number of public listening events were held, from August 24–30, 2009. Connick did not attend the exclusive vinyl listening events, which were held in cities such as Orlando, Florida, Washington, D.C., Chicago, New York, Oakland, California, New Orleans, West Babylon, New York, and Los Angeles.

He made a number of TV appearances in September and October 2009. In September he appeared on Oprah on the 25th, then on Today (28th), The View (29th), and Late Show with David Letterman and Imus in the Morning on September 30. In October, he was a guest on the Today on the 1st, Rachael Ray in the week of October 5, and he set out to a week-long promotional tour in Australia from October 2 through to 9th, which included a visit to Hey Hey It's Saturday, and an appearance as a guest judge on Australian Idol on October 11, 2009.

Release

The album was released first in the United States on a limited edition double vinyl LP on August 25, 2009. The CD album was released on September 22.

The first single of the album was Burt Bacharach and Hal David's "(They Long to Be) Close to You", and it was released exclusively on Amazon.com on August 25, 2009.

After the U.S. release, Connick was in Paris, France in September 2009, to record a song with French First Lady Carla Bruni. She and Connick's wife, Jill Goodacre, both former supermodels, are long time friends. The duet is a French and Italian version of "And I love her", written by Lennon–McCartney. The duet is released as a bonus track on European editions of Your Songs.

As of 2013, the album has sold 396,000 copies in United States.

Tour
A worldwide concert tour began in January 2010.

Tour dates

Asia (2010)
 May 16 – Abu Dhabi Hall – Abu Dhabi, United Arab Emirates
Europe (2010)
 May 18 – Istanbul Kongre Merkezi – Istanbul, Turkey
 May 21 – Mawazine Festival – Rabat, Morocco
North America (2010)
 June 9 – The View, New York
 June 10 – Late Show with David Letterman, New York
 June 11 – Fox Theatre, St. Louis
 June 12 – PNC Pavilion, Cincinnati
 June 13 – Charlottesville Pavilion, Charlottesville, Virginia
 June 15 – The Filene Center at Wolf Trap Vienna, Virginia
 June 16 – Blumenthal Performing Arts Center, Charlotte, North Carolina
 June 18 – Peace Center for the Performing Arts, Greenville, South Carolina
 June 19 – Chastain Park Amphitheatre, Atlanta
 June 21 – Morris Performing Arts Center, South Bend, Indiana
 June 22–23 – Chicago Theatre, Chicago
 June 25 – Jazz Aspen Snowmass, Aspen, Colorado
 June 27 – Toronto Jazz Festival – Canon Theatre, Toronto
Asia (2010)
 July 2 – USA Pavilion, National Day Gala Performance, Shanghai, China
North America (2010)
 July 15–31 Neil Simon Theatre, New York
 August 13–14 – Hollywood Bowl, Hollywood, California
 September 17 – Grand Theatre at Grand Sierra Resort Reno, Nevada
 September 18 – The Mountain Winery, Saratoga, California
 September 19 – Monterey Jazz Festival – Jimmy Lyons Stage, Monterey, California
 September 21 – Wente Vineyards, Livermore, California
 September 22 – Britt Pavilion, Jacksonville, Oregon
 September 24 – Queen Elizabeth Theatre, Vancouver, BC
 September 25 – Chateau Ste. Michelle, Woodinville, Washington
 September 26 – Chateau Ste. Michelle, Woodinville, Washington
 September 28 – Schnitzer Concert Hall, Portland, Oregon
 September 29 – Borgata Hotel Casino & Spa, Atlantic City, New Jersey
 September 30 – The Academy of Music, Philadelphia, Pennsylvania
|-
North America (2011)
 March 25 – WinStar World Casino, Thackerville, Oklahoma
 March 26 – Long Center for the Performing Arts, Austin, Texas
 March 28 – River Center, Baton Rouge, Louisiana
 March 29 – Jones Hall, Houston
 April 1 – IP Casino Resort & Spa, Biloxi, Mississippi
 April 2 – IP Casino Resort & Spa, Biloxi, Mississippi
 April 4 – Mahalia Jackson Theater, New Orleans
 April 7 – Van Wezel Performing Arts Hall, Sarasota, Florida
 April 8 – Ruth Eckerd Hall, Clearwater, Florida
 April 9 – Mizner Park Amphitheater at Downtown Boca, Boca Raton, Florida
 April 10 – Bob Carr Performing Arts Centre, Orlando, Florida
 April 11 – Philharmonic Center for the Arts, Naples, Florida
 April 20 – Count Basie Theatre, Red Bank, New Jersey
 April 21 – Count Basie Theatre, Red Bank, New Jersey
 April 22 – MGM Grand Theater at MGM Grand at Foxwoods, Mashantucket, Connecticut
 04/26/2011 – 04/30/2011 The Colonial Theatre, Boston

Broadway

He held a series of concerts, called Harry Connick Jr. in Concert on Broadway, at the Neil Simon Theatre on Broadway, from July 15 to July 31, 2010. The concerts on July 30 and 31 were filmed live, and aired on PBS on March 2, 2011 for a "Great Performances" special on the concerts. These were also released on video, CD/DVD and album in March 2011, as Harry Connick Jr.: In Concert on Broadway.

Harry Connick Jr. won an Emmy Award in the category Outstanding Music Direction for Harry Connick Jr. In Concert on Broadway.

The In Concert on Broadway album is nominated for a Grammy Award for Best Traditional Pop Vocal Album.

Track listing

Barnes & Noble Exclusive Version

iTunes

European Editions

Japan Edition

Deluxe Limited Edition CD/DVD package

US only. Available through hconnickjr.com.
DVD includes behind the scenes footage, and the "(They Long To Be) Close To You" music video

Personnel
Harry Connick Jr. – vocals, piano
Branford Marsalis – saxophone (track #1)
Wynton Marsalis – trumpet (track #3)
Leroy Jones – trumpet (track #5)
Ben Wolfe – bass
Arthur Latin II – drums 
Bryan Sutton – guitar
Roger Ingram – trumpet
Wayne Bergeron – trumpet
John Fumo – trumpet
Warren Lunning – trumpet
The Honolulu Heartbreakers – vocals

Release history

Chart positions

Awards and nominations
Your Songs was nominated for a Grammy Award, in the category Best Traditional Pop Vocal Album. This was announced on Wednesday, December 2, 2009. The 52nd Grammy Awards took place on January 31, 2010 in Los Angeles. The award went to Michael Bublé for his Michael Bublé Meets Madison Square Garden.

References

External links
 Official site 
 Harry Connick Jr. online interview by Pete Lewis, 'Blues & Soul' November 2009
 Video interview: Harry Connick Jr. and Clive Davis Talks About the Album at Access Hollywood

2009 albums
Harry Connick Jr. albums
Albums produced by Clive Davis
Columbia Records albums